E74-like factor 2 (ELF2), formerly known as new Ets-related factor (NERF), is an ETS family transcription factor. In humans this protein is encoded by the ELF2 gene.

References

Further reading

Transcription factors